Sir Charles Fergusson, 7th Baronet (1865–1951) was a British Army officer and Governor-General of New Zealand.

Charles Fergusson may also refer to:
Sir Charles Dalrymple Fergusson, 5th Baronet (1800–1849), Scottish lawyer
Sir Charles Fergusson, 9th Baronet, of the Fergusson baronets

See also
Charles Ferguson (disambiguation)
Charles Fergusson Forbes (1779–1852), English army surgeon